Merry Christmas ... Have a Nice Life is the sixth studio album and first Christmas album released by Cyndi Lauper.  It combines original compositions by Lauper and collaborator Jan Pulsford with traditional Christmas songs. "Feels Like Christmas" previously appeared on Lauper's 1993 album Hat Full of Stars.
The album has sold 26,000 copies in the United States, according to Nielsen SoundScan. The album was released for the first time on (limited green) vinyl, 1,000 pressings, in November 2019.

Track listing 
 "Home on Christmas Day" (Rob Hyman, Cyndi Lauper, William Wittman) – 4:06
 "Early Christmas Morning" (Lauper, Jan Pulsford) – 5:07 (Previously released on Sisters of Avalon Japanese Edition, this version uses different backing vocals)
 "Rockin' Around the Christmas Tree" (Johnny Marks) – 2:45
 "Christmas Conga" (Lauper, Pulsford) – 3:31
 "Minnie and Santa" (Lauper, Pulsford) – 3:55
 "Feels Like Christmas" (Eric Bazilian, Hyman, Lauper) – 4:30 (Previously released on Hat Full of Stars)
 "Three Ships" (Traditional) – 2:08
 "New Year's Baby (First Lullaby)" (Lauper) – 4:27
 "December Child" (Lauper, Pulsford) – 3:11
 "In the Bleak Midwinter" (Gustav Holst, Christina Rossetti) – 4:02
 "Silent Night" (Franz Gruber, Josef Mohr) – 4:18

All tracks produced by Cyndi Lauper, Jan Pulsford and William Wittman except:
"Early Christmas Morning" produced by Cyndi Lauper, Jan Pulsford and Mark Saunders
"Home on Christmas Day" and "Rockin' Around the Christmas Tree" produced by Cyndi Lauper and William Wittman
"Feels Like Christmas" produced by Cyndi Lauper and Junior Vasquez

Personnel

Cyndi Lauper – lead vocals, background vocals (4, 8), rhythm guitar (1), dulcimer (1, 7), omnichord banjo (5), drums (5), clogging (7), tin whistle (7, 10), recorder (7, 9), slide baritone ukele (8)
Rob Hyman - synths (1), backing vocals (1), organ (3), melodica (3), beatbox (3), accordion (4, 7)
William Wittman - 12-string guitar (1), electric bass guitar (1, 3, 5, 8), backing vocals (1, 3), organ (1), drums (1), omnichord (3), additional recording (11)
Jan Pulsford - loops (1, 4, 8), synths (4, 8, 9, 10) organ (5), harp (5), digital editing (7, 10), transcription (2), additional keys (11), sampling (11)
Catherine Russell - background vocals (4)
The Inquisitors - background vocals (4, 5, 8)
Tom Malone - trombone (4)
Jim Hynes - trumpet (4)
Peter Eldridge - transcription (5, 11)
David Schnaufer - dulcimer (7, 10), Tennessee music box (7, 10)
Declyn Wallace Lauper-Thornton - baby gurgling (8)

Chatterton Elementary School Choir, Merrick, NY("Early Christmas Morning" and "Silent Night")
Justine Lane
Alexandra Thornton
Jessica Haviland
Julianna Cohen
Liza Witmer
Marti Gruber
Christopher Safrath
Brian Zagon
Stefanie Salino
Caroline Walker
Sheahan Brown
Gregory Meditz
Erica Leigh Meditz
Julia Kelsey
Claudia Greenspan (Choir Mistress)

Charts

Release history

References 

Cyndi Lauper albums
1998 Christmas albums
Epic Records albums
Christmas albums by American artists
Pop rock Christmas albums
Albums recorded in a home studio